Dundas Island is an island on the North Coast of British Columbia, Canada, located on the west side of Chatham Sound to the northwest of Prince Rupert.  It is the largest of a group of islands known as the Dundas Islands.

History
The island and its archipelago were named in 1792 by Captain George Vancouver in honour of the Rt. Hon. Henry Dundas (1742–1811), Treasurer of the Navy, 1783–1801, who was granted the title of Viscount Melville in 1802 and also named Baron Dunira.  The Dundas islands were originally perceived by Vancouver to be one island which he named Dundas's Island.  Among the smaller islands of the group are Baron Island, Dunira Island, Melville Island and other small islands and islets on the west side of Chatham Sound between Brown and Caamaño Passages.

Dundas Island in Nunavut, northern Canada is also named after Dundas.

Dundas' son, Robert Dundas, 2nd Viscount Melville is the namesake of Melville Island in the Northwest Territories and Nunavut, and also Melville Island in Australia, which was the site of the short-lived Fort Dundas.

References

Islands of British Columbia
North Coast of British Columbia